Alejandro René Eleodoro Guillier Álvarez (born 5 March 1953) is a Chilean sociologist, television and radio journalist, and independent politician. He is a Senator of the 2nd District of Antofagasta and was the 2017 Presidential candidate of the New Majority.

Guillier ran in the New Majority primary for the 2017 election and was the coalition's standard bearer in the 2017 Presidential Elections to replace term-limited president Michelle Bachelet. Among others, he faced former PPD President Ricardo Lagos before the latter's withdrawal from the contest.

Polling showed him to be competitive against Chile Vamos candidate Sebastián Piñera, although his support slipped in the run up to the election and after a series of splits between the traditional left coalition block.

Gullier is a freemason and a member of the Valparaíso Parliamentary Lodge since 2014.

References

External links

 Biography by CIDOB (in Spanish)

1953 births
Catholic University of the North alumni
Candidates for President of Chile
Chilean Freemasons
Chilean journalists
Chilean television presenters
Chilean people of French descent
Living people
Radical Social Democratic Party of Chile politicians
Senators of the LV Legislative Period of the National Congress of Chile